William Neel (died 1418), of Chichester, Sussex and London, was an English politician.

He was a Member (MP) of the Parliament of England for Chichester in February 1388, 1399 and 1415. He was Mayor of Chichester Michaelmas in 1393–95 and 1401–02.

References

14th-century births
1418 deaths
English MPs February 1388
English MPs 1399
English MPs 1415
Mayors of Chichester